Museum of African Art may refer to:

Africa 

 IFAN Museum of African Arts, Senegal

Europe 

 Royal Museum for Central Africa, Tervuren, Belgium
 Museum of African Art, Serbia

North America 

 The Africa Center, New York City, formerly known as the Museum for African Art and the Center for African Art
 National Museum of African Art, Washington, D.C.